Nils Daniel Tarschys (born July 21, 1943, Stockholm, Sweden), is a professor of political science at Stockholm University. 

Tarschys was born into an academic family. Both his parents taught in Swedish universities. He is married and has two daughters. 

He was Secretary General of the Council of Europe from 20 June 1994 to 1 September 1999, when he was succeeded by Walter Schwimmer. His tenure was remarkable for the accession of a number of countries, notably Russia, to  the Council of Europe. He is credited with the motto "Better include than exclude".

He repeatedly defended the accession of Russia against criticism that it was premature and that Russia was not yet ready to embrace the standards of the Council of Europe.

In 1972 he completed his PhD thesis on "Beyond the State. The Future Polity in Classical and Soviet Marxism". 

He was appointed professor of Eastern European research at Uppsala University in 1983 and professor of political science at Stockholm University in 1985.

He was a member of the Swedish Parliament for the Liberal Party in 1976–1982 and 1985–1994, representing the Stockholm county.  He chaired the Social Committee from 1985–1991 and the Foreign Affairs Committee from 1991–1994.

He was also a member of the  Swedish delegation to the Parliamentary Assembly of the Council of Europe.

He served as State Secretary from 1978-79 in the cabinet of Prime Minister Ola Ullsten.

He has published numerous papers and reports. In 2008 he was elected to the Royal Swedish Academy of Sciences.

External links
 File on Council of Europe website

Bibliography
 The Soviet political agenda : problems and priorities, 1950–1970, Macmillan, 1979
 Promoting Cohesion: The Role of the European Union, Arena Conference, 2002
 Maximising what? On the multiple objectives of EU cohesion policy, Maribor, 2008

References

1943 births
Living people
Members of the Royal Swedish Academy of Sciences
Swedish political scientists
Council of Europe Secretaries-General
Grand Crosses with Star and Sash of the Order of Merit of the Federal Republic of Germany